This is a list of fellows of the Royal Society elected in 1992.

Fellows

Jerry McKee Adams
James Greig Arthur
Elizabeth Blackburn
Sir Colin Blakemore
Geoffrey Boulton
Suzanne Cory
Rodney Deane Davies
Peter Neville Goodfellow
Ian Philip Grant
Geoffrey Wilson Greenwood
Richard Langton Gregory  (1923–2010)
Charles Nicholas Hales (1935–2005) 
Paul H. Harvey
Sir David Jack (1924–2011)
Alwyn Jones
Peter George Lecomber
David Graham Lloyd
Raymond Douglas Lund
Keith Alan McLauchlan
John Bryce McLeod
Andrew James McMichael
Michael Mingos
Leslie Sydney Dennis Morley  (1924–2011)
Roddam Narasimha
John O'Keefe
Bernard Ephraim Julius Pagel  (1930–2007)
Godfrey Stuart Pawley
David N. Payne
Gordon Plotkin
Robert Ramage
Sir Alan Rudge
Andrew N. Schofield
David John Sherratt
Alain Townsend
Endel Tulving
James Johnson Turner
Daniel Frank Walls (1942–1999)
Nigel Weiss
William Joseph Whelan
John Raymond Willis

Foreign members

Paul Berg
Luigi Luca Cavalli-Sforza
Masao Ito
William Platt Jencks
Chen-Ning Yang

References

1992
1992 in science
1992 in the United Kingdom